Delavan is an unincorporated community in Morris County, Kansas, United States.

History
The post office in Delavan was discontinued in 1992.

Education
The community is served by Morris County USD 417 public school district.

References

Further reading

External links
 Morris County maps: Current, Historic, KDOT

Unincorporated communities in Morris County, Kansas
Unincorporated communities in Kansas